USS Desire (SP-786) was a United States Navy patrol vessel in commission from 1917 to 1919.

Desire was built as a private motorboat of the same name in 1913 by J. W. Munn at Galveston, Texas. In 1917, the U.S. Navy acquired her under a free lease from her owner, Clifford Abeles of St. Louis, Missouri, for use as a section patrol boat during World War I. She was commissioned on 14 June 1917 as USS Desire (SP-786).

Assigned to the 5th Naval District, Desire carried out patrol duties and transported customs inspectors for the rest of World War I.

Desire was decommissioned and returned to Abeles on 2 January 1919.

References

Department of the Navy Naval History and Heritage Command Online Library of Selected Images: Civilian Ships: Desire (American Motor Boat, 1913). Was USS Desire (SP-786) in 1917-1919
NavSource Online: Section Patrol Craft Photo Archive Desire (SP 786)

Patrol vessels of the United States Navy
World War I patrol vessels of the United States
Ships built in Galveston, Texas
1913 ships